Madison Female Academy was a school for girls which flourished in the 19th century in Madison, Wisconsin, USA, and is now mainly famous as the site of the first classes held by the University of Wisconsin–Madison.

In the late 19th century, its grounds were acquired to become a railway depot. After some years operating from less satisfactory premises the school closed.

References

External links
 TEACHER’S HERITAGE RESOURCE GUIDE (PDF) at the US Department of the Interior site.
 The story of Madison at The State of Wisconsin Collection online.

Education in Madison, Wisconsin
Female seminaries in the United States
Defunct schools in Wisconsin